Gooseberry is an unincorporated community in Morrow County, Oregon, United States. Gooseberry lies along Ione–Gooseberry Road near its intersection with Oregon Route 206 between Heppner to the east and Condon to the west.

Cattlemen began referring to the location as Gooseberry Spring as early as 1872. Its name came from a large wild gooseberry bush near the spring. A Gooseberry post office operated in the community from 1884 through 1918.

References

1872 establishments in Oregon
Populated places established in 1872
Unincorporated communities in Morrow County, Oregon
Unincorporated communities in Oregon